Kuzemko may refer to:

People with the surname 

 Anna Kuzemko, Ukrainian scientist in the fields of botany, ecology, and nature conservation
 Irene Kuzemko, Ukrainian-Russian intersex woman